The Swiss Science Center Technorama (Swiss German native name: Technorama) is a science museum in the municipality of Winterthur in the canton of Zürich, Switzerland.

History 
In 1947 an association for the establishment of a technical museum in Switzerland was launched, and objects were held by the industrial companies of the Winterthur–Zürich–Baden region. On 26 June 1969, a foundation in accordance with Art. 80 ff ZGB was founded under the name Technorama der Schweiz, purposing science and technology for vivid spectacle. In 1982 an exhibition was presented, but in a conservative way being a conventional technology museum, covered by verbal information masses, mainly in the form of an audiovisual superstructure. In June 1990 a new mission statement was adopted, created by the former director Remo Besio. Essentially, it was inspired and designed by the leading science centers of the UK and the US, including the Exploratorium in San Francisco. The theoretical basis were the considerations of Frank Oppenheimer and Richard Gregory, to establish an interactive science museum, as well as publications by Steven Pizzey, and reports and evaluations of the Association of Science and Technology Centers. Finally, both incorporated in the model as well as the principles and suggestions of Hugo Kükelhaus. Until 2000, Technorama was converted from a classical museum into a Science Center, a vivid atmosphere that encourages hands-on experiments. The increase and proportion of adolescents and children of pre-school niveau as visitors, established Technorama as part of the educational system and as additional extracurricular lessons. In 1999 occurred a reorganization of the foundation and a cleanup of its structure, and the revision of the regulations and statutes. In 2012 the museum was rebuilt and the expansion of the laboratory area was done.

In 2016 the Swiss Science Center Technorama achieved a new visitor record, and for the first time, the museum was also open on Monday all year. Among the 281,4217 visitors, 60,545 pupils attended the museum; 70% were from Swiss schools.

Museum 
Technorama offers an experimental environment for its visitors, irrespective of age and background, to improve knowledge about natural phenomena in a self-directed way. Usually worldwide described as “science centres”, Technorama's program may differ markedly: there are over 500 exhibits respectively "experiment stations" and wide-ranging "laboratory facilities". Technorama claims to be "one of the largest – and on account of its quality and its exemplary informal educational function – most renowned science centres in the world".

Everything in the Technorama facility is based on the way in which science can best be appreciated, taught and learnt, in school or in practice, providing teachers with training in the principles of science education or by enabling schools to use its unique experimental and laboratory resources. Technorama provides a personal contact with natural phenomena, so that the personal experience with science replaces dry fact-learning. The exhibits try to invoke all the senses for learning, as the essential basis for later theoretical treatment. The exhibits allow the visitors to “get in touch with science”.

Every year over 60,000 school children in organised groups visit Technorama, therefore claiming by far to be the most popular out-of-school science learning institution in Switzerland. The so-called Youth Laboratory comprises chemistry and atom labs, as well as numerous experiment stations for biology, physics, and uptodate visualisation technology, providing an environment which develops the familiarity with quantitative scientific work in a relaxed atmosphere.

The school's service supports teachers in communicating science, and it is involved in national initiatives aimed at improving science education. In particular the program is orientated to the primary school sector, where usually are the largest deficits, and it is imperative to enthuse children with scientific and technical ideas as early as possible. Every year, more than 1,000 teachers attend Technorama's in-service.

Spielzeugeisenbahn-Sammlung Bommer 

That section houses the world's number one metal toy collection Spielzeugeisenbahn-Sammlung Bommer of miniature rarities, that was established in February 2004. The exhibition offers an extended exploration of tinplate toy nostalgia and its curiosities, many of them dating from the period around 1900 AD. Technorama claims to be the home to the world's greatest toy train collection, the Dr. Bommer Toy Train Foundation, that provides a technically and historically important view of the development of rail transportation in Switzerland.

AdventureRooms Technorama 
In 2017 the Swiss Science Center Technorama opened the escape room "AdventureRooms Technorama" in cooperation with AdventureRooms. There are two games: "Spektrum" and "Kontinuum". The riddles are based on scientific and technological phenomena.

The AdventureRooms Technorama are located in the same building as the Swiss Science Center Technorama, but can be visited separately.

Facilities 
Public transportation is provided by the S-Bahn Zürich line S12 (ZVV) or S29 (ZVV) to Oberwinterthur, or by Winterthur local bus line 5 to the stop Technorama.

The museum is open daily from 10am to 5pm. After-hours visits are available by appointment, as well as guided tours for groups. The building houses the museum on about 6,500 square meters, as well as a restaurant, the escape room "AdventureRooms Technorama" and rooms for seminars. The staff of the museum consists of approximately 105 employees in 54 full-time jobs. The Swiss Science Centre Technorama is directed by the Technorama Foundation, and sponsored by companies and institutions.

Cultural heritage of national importance 
In the Swiss inventory of cultural property of national and regional significance the museum respectively the Spielzeugeisenbahn-Sammlung Bommer is listed as a Class A object of national importance.

Literature 
 Hans-Erhard Lessing: Naturschön - Phänomene im Technorama. Verlag Huber, Frauenfeld 2006, .

References

External links 

  
 Website dedicated to Technorama online experiments
 https://www.technorama.adventurerooms.ch official Website AdventureRooms Technorama

Science museums in Switzerland
Museums in the canton of Zürich
Winterthur
Science and technology in Switzerland
Cultural property of national significance in the canton of Zürich
Museums established in 1982
1982 establishments in Switzerland
Modernist architecture in Switzerland